Gignac-Cressensac is a railway station between Gignac and Cressensac, Occitanie, France. The station opened in 1889 and is on the Orléans–Montauban railway line. The station is served by TER (local) services.

Train services
The following services currently call at Gignac-Cressensac:
local service (TER Occitanie) Brive-la-Gaillarde–Cahors–Montauban–Toulouse

References

Railway stations in France opened in 1889
Railway stations in Lot (department)